Sophia ( sophía "wisdom") is a central idea in Hellenistic philosophy and religion, Platonism, Gnosticism and Christian theology.  Originally carrying a meaning of "cleverness, skill", the later meaning of the term, close to the meaning of Phronesis ("wisdom, intelligence"), was significantly shaped by the term philosophy ("love of wisdom") as used by Plato.

In the Orthodox Church and the Catholic Church, the feminine personification of divine wisdom as Holy Wisdom ( Hagía Sophía) can refer either to Jesus Christ the Word of God (as in the dedication of the church of Hagia Sophia in Constantinople) or to the Holy Spirit.

References to Sophia in Koine Greek translations of the Hebrew Bible translate to the Hebrew term Chokhmah.

Greek and Hellenistic tradition

These words share the same Proto-Indo-European root as the Latin verb , whence . The noun  as "skill in handicraft and art" is Homeric and in Pindar is used to describe both Hephaestos and Athena.

Before Plato, the term for "sound judgment, intelligence, practical wisdom" and so on, such qualities as are ascribed to the Seven Sages of Greece, was phronesis, from phren, while sophia referred to technical skill.

The term philosophia was primarily used after the time of Plato, following his teacher Socrates, though it has been said that Pythagoras was the first to call himself a philosopher. This understanding of philosophia permeates Plato's dialogues, especially the Republic. In that work, the leaders of the proposed utopia are to be philosopher kings: rulers who are lovers of wisdom. According to Plato in Apology, Socrates himself was dubbed "the wisest [, ] man of Greece" by the Pythian Oracle. Socrates defends this verdict in Apology to the effect that he, at least, knows that he knows nothing. Socratic skepticism is contrasted with the approach of the sophists, who are attacked in Gorgias for relying merely on eloquence. Cicero in  later criticized Plato for his separation of wisdom from eloquence. Sophia is named as one of the four cardinal virtues (in place of phronesis) in Plato's Protagoras.

Philo, a Hellenized Jew writing in Alexandria, attempted to harmonize Platonic philosophy and Jewish scripture. Also influenced by Stoic philosophical concepts, he used the Koine term logos for the role and function of Wisdom, a concept later adapted by the author of the Gospel of John in the opening verses and applied to Jesus as the Word (Logos) of God the Father.

In Gnosticism, Sophia is a feminine figure, analogous to the soul, but also simultaneously one of the emanations of the Monad. Gnostics held that she was the syzygy of Jesus (i.e. the Bride of Christ) and was the Holy Spirit of the Trinity.

Christian theology

Christian theology received the Old Testament personification of Divine Wisdom (Septuagint Sophia, Vulgate Sapientia).  The connection of Divine Wisdom to the concept of the Logos resulted in the interpretation of "Holy Wisdom" (Hagia Sophia) as an aspect of Christ the Logos.

The expression  itself is not found in the New Testament, even though passages in the Pauline epistles equate Christ with the "wisdom of God". The clearest form of the identification of Divine Wisdom with Christ comes in 1 Corinthians 1:17–2:13. In 1 Cor. 2:7, Paul speaks of the Wisdom of God as a mystery which was "ordained before the world unto our glory".

Christology
Following 1 Corinthians, the Church Fathers named Christ as "Wisdom of God".  Therefore, when rebutting claims about Christ's ignorance, Gregory of Nazianzus insisted that, inasmuch as he was divine, Christ knew everything: "How can he be ignorant of anything that is, when he is Wisdom, the maker of the worlds, who brings all things to fulfillment and recreates all things, who is the end of all that has come into being?" (Orationes, 30.15). Irenaeus represents another, minor patristic tradition which identified the Spirit of God, and not Christ himself, as "Wisdom" (Adversus haereses, 4.20.1–3; cf. 3.24.2; 4.7.3; 4.20.3). He could appeal to Paul's teaching about wisdom being one of the gifts of the Holy Spirit (1 Cor. 12:8). However, the majority applied to Christ the title/name of "Wisdom". 

Constantine the Great set a pattern for Eastern Christians by dedicating a church to Christ as the personification of Divine Wisdom. In Constantinople, under Justinian I, the Hagia Sophia ("Holy Wisdom") was rebuilt, consecrated in 538, and became a model for many other Byzantine churches.  In the Latin Church, however, "the Word" or Logos came through more clearly than "the Wisdom" of God as a central, high title of Christ.  

In the theology of the Eastern Orthodox Church, Holy Wisdom is understood as the Divine Logos who became incarnate as Jesus; this belief being sometimes also expressed in some Eastern Orthodox icons. In the Divine Liturgy of the Orthodox Church, the exclamation Sophia! or in English Wisdom! will be proclaimed by the deacon or priest at certain moments, especially before the reading of scripture, to draw the congregation's attention to sacred teaching.

There is a hagiographical tradition, dating to the late sixth century, of a Saint Sophia and her three daughters, Saints Faith, Hope and Charity. This has been taken as the veneration of allegorical figures from an early time, and the group of saints has become popular in Russian Orthodox iconography as such (the names of the daughters rendered as ). The veneration of the three saints named for the three theological virtues probably arose in the 6th century.

Iconography

The Christological identification of Christ the Logos with Divine Wisdom (Hagia Sophia) is strongly represented in the iconographic tradition of the Russian Orthodox Church. A type of icon of the Theotokos is "Wisdom hath builded Her house" (Премудрость созда Себе дом), a quote from Proverbs 9:1 ("Wisdom hath builded her house, she hath hewn out her seven pillars") interpreted as prefiguring the incarnation, with the Theotokos being the "house" chosen by the "hypostatic Wisdom" (i.e. "Wisdom" as a person of the Trinity).

Christian mysticism

In Russian Orthodox mysticism, Sophia became increasingly indistinguishable from the person of the Theotokos (rather than Christ), to the point of the implication of the Theotokos as a "fourth person of the Trinity".

Such interpretations became popular in the late nineteenth to early twentieth centuries, forwarded by authors such as  Vladimir Solovyov, Pavel Florensky, Nikolai Berdyaev, and Sergei Bulgakov. Bulgakov's theology, known as "Sophianism", presented Divine Wisdom as "consubstantiality of the Holy Trinity", operating as the aspect of consubstantiality (ousia or physis, substantia or natura) or "hypostaticity" of the Trinity of the three hypostases, the Father, the Son, and the Holy Spirit, "which safeguards the unity of the Holy Trinity". It was the topic of a highly political controversy in the early 1930s and was condemned by the Russian Orthodox church as heretical in 1935.

Within the Protestant tradition in England, Jane Leade, seventeenth-century Christian mystic, Universalist, and founder of the Philadelphian Society, wrote copious descriptions of her visions and dialogues with the "Virgin Sophia" who, she said, revealed to her the spiritual workings of the Universe.
Leade was hugely influenced by the theosophical writings of sixteenth century German Christian mystic Jakob Böhme, who also speaks of the Sophia in works such as The Way to Christ (1624). Jakob Böhme was very influential to a number of Christian mystics and religious leaders, including George Rapp, William Law, and the Harmony Society.

Personification

Sophia is not a "goddess" in classical Greek tradition; Greek goddesses associated with wisdom are Metis and Athena (Latin Minerva). By the Roman Empire, it became common to depict the cardinal virtues and other abstract ideals as female allegories. Thus, in the Library of Celsus in Ephesus, built in the 2nd century, there are four statues of female allegories, depicting wisdom (Sophia), knowledge (Episteme), intelligence (Ennoia) and valour/excellence (Arete). In the same period, Sophia assumes aspects of a goddess or angelic power in Gnosticism.

In Christian iconography, Holy Wisdom or Hagia Sophia was depicted as a female allegory from the medieval period. In Western (Latin) tradition, she appears as a crowned virgin; in Russian Orthodox tradition, she has a more supernatural aspect of a crowned woman with wings in a glowing red colour.
The virgin martyrs Faith Hope and Charity with their mother Sophia are depicted as three small girls standing in front of their mother in widow's dress.

Allegory of Wisdom and Strength is a painting by Paolo Veronese, created circa 1565 in Venice. It is a large-scale allegorical painting depicting Divine Wisdom personified on the left and Hercules, representing Strength and earthly concerns, on the right.

Modern reception
 
A goddess Sophia was introduced into Anthroposophy by its founder, Rudolf Steiner, in his book The Goddess: From Natura to Divine Sophia and a later compilation of his writings titled Isis Mary Sophia. Sophia also figures prominently in Theosophy, a spiritual movement which Anthroposophy was closely related to. Helena Blavatsky, the founder of Theosophy, described it in her essay What is Theosophy? as an esoteric wisdom doctrine, and said that the "Wisdom" referred to was "an emanation of the Divine principle" typified by "…some goddesses—Metis, Neitha, Athena, the Gnostic Sophia…"

Since the 1970s, Sophia has also been invoked as a goddess in Dianic Wicca and related currents of feminist spirituality.

The 1979 installation artwork The Dinner Party features a place setting for Sophia.

There is a monumental sculpture of Holy Wisdom depicted as a "goddess" in Sofia, the capital of Bulgaria (the city itself is named after Saint Sofia Church). The sculpture was erected in 2000 to replace a statue of Lenin.

See also
 Chokhmah, related concept in Judaism and Kabbalah
 Christology
 Holy Wisdom
 Pneumatology
 Prajnaparamita, similar concept in Mahayana Buddhism
 Sophia (Gnosticism)
 Sophiology, or Sophianism
 Sophism
 Wisdom literature
 Wisdom (personification)

References

Bibliography
 T. Hainthaler, F. Mali, G. Emmenegger, & M. L. Ostermann (eds.), Sophia. The Wisdom of God - Die Weisheit Gottes. Forscher aus dem Osten und Westen Europas an den Quellen des gemeinsamen Glaubens  (Innsbruck, Wien: Tyrolia-Verlag) .
 Bulgakov, Sergei, "Sophia. The Wisdom of God. An Outline of Sophiology" (Hudson, NY: Lindisfarne Press, 1993) .
 Hunt, Priscilla, "The Wisdom Iconography of Light: The Genesis, Meaning and Iconographic Realization of a Symbol", Byzantino-slavica 67 (2009).
 Hunt, Priscilla, "Confronting the End: The Interpretation of the Last Judgment in a Novgorod Wisdom Icon", Byzantino-Slavica, 65, 2007, 275–325.
 Hunt, Priscilla, "The Novgorod Sophia Icon and 'The Problem of Old Russian Culture' Between Orthodoxy and Sophiology", Symposion: A Journal of Russian Thought, vol. 4–5, (2000), 1–41.
 Hunt, Priscilla, "Andrei Rublev’s Old Testament Trinity Icon in Cultural Context", The Trinity-Sergius Lavr in Russian History and Culture: Readings in Russian Religious Culture, vol. 3, Deacon Vladimir Tsurikov, ed., Jordanville, NY: Holy Trinity Seminary Press, 2006, 99–122.
 Schipflinger, Thomas, Sophia-Maria (in German: 1988; English translation: York Beach, ME: Samuel Wiser, 1998) .
 Versluis, Arthur, Theosophia: hidden dimensions of Christianity (Hudson, NY: Lindisfarne Press, 1994) .
 Versluis, Arthur, Wisdom’s children: a Christian esoteric tradition (Albany, NY: SUNY Press, 1999) .
 Versluis, Arthur  (ed.) Wisdom’s book: the Sophia anthology (St.Paul, Min: Paragon House, 2000) .

External links

 Divine Wisdom articles compiled by Priscilla Hunt
 Virgin Sophia - Rosicrucian Library
 Texts about the controversy with regard to Bulgakov's sophiology (in German, English, Russian, French)

Biblical cosmology
Christology
Gnosticism
Greek words and phrases
Platonism
Concepts in ancient Greek ethics
Wisdom
Wisdom goddesses
Concepts in ancient Greek philosophy of mind